Ivory Joe Hunter (October 10, 1914 – November 8, 1974) was an American rhythm-and-blues singer, songwriter, and pianist.  After a series of hits on the US R&B chart starting in the mid-1940s, he became more widely known for his hit recording "Since I Met You Baby" (1956). He was billed as The Baron of the Boogie, and also known as The Happiest Man Alive. His musical output ranged from R&B to blues, boogie-woogie, and country music, and Hunter made a name in all of those genres. Uniquely, he was honored at both the Monterey Jazz Festival and the Grand Ole Opry.

Early years
Hunter was born in Kirbyville, Texas. Ivory Joe was his given name, not a nickname nor a stage name. According to Hunter, when he was born his parents thought he "looked just like the baby on the outside of the Castoria Ivory bottle, so they called [him] Ivory."

As a youngster in a large family of musicians, he developed an early interest in music. His father, Dave Hunter, played guitar, and his mother sang gospel. Hunter was a talented pianist by the age of 13, playing in school orchestras.

He graduated high school in 1930 and made his first recording for Alan Lomax and the Library of Congress as a teenager, in 1933.

Hunter was the uncle of Rick Stevens, the original lead vocalist for Tower of Power.

Radio and recordings
In the early 1940s, Hunter had his own radio show in Beaumont, Texas, on KFDM, for which he eventually became program manager. In 1942 he moved to Los Angeles, joining Johnny Moore's Three Blazers in the mid-1940s. He wrote and recorded his first song, "Blues at Sunrise", with the Three Blazers for his own label, Ivory Records, it became a nationwide hit on the R&B chart in 1945.

In the late 1940s, Hunter founded Pacific Records. In 1947, he recorded for Four Star Records and King Records. Two years later, he recorded further R&B hits; on "I Quit My Pretty Mama" and "Guess Who" he was backed by members of Duke Ellington's band.

After signing with MGM Records, he recorded "I Almost Lost My Mind", which topped the 1950 R&B charts and would later (in the wake of Hunter's success with "Since I Met You Baby") be recorded by Pat Boone, whose version became a number one pop hit. "I Need You So" was a number two R&B hit that same year. With his smooth delivery, Hunter became a popular R&B artist, and he also began to be noticed in the country music community. In April 1951, he made his network TV debut on You Asked for It. He toured widely with a backing band and became known for his large build (he was 6 feet 4 inches tall), his brightly colored stage suits, and his volatile temperament.

By 1954, he had recorded more than 100 songs and moved to Atlantic Records. His first song to cross over to the pop charts was "Since I Met You Baby" (1956). It was to be his only Top 40 pop song, reaching number 12 on the pop chart.

While visiting Memphis, Tennessee, in the spring of 1957, Hunter was invited by Elvis Presley to visit Graceland. The two spent the day together, singing "I Almost Lost My Mind" and other songs together. Hunter commented, "He is very spiritually minded... he showed me every courtesy, and I think he's one of the greatest." Presley recorded several of his songs, including "I Need You So", "My Wish Came True" and "Ain't That Lovin' You, Baby". Later, Presley would record "I Will Be True" and "It's Still Here" in May 1971. Hunter was a prolific songwriter, and some estimate he wrote more than 7,000 songs.

Country comeback
Hunter's "Empty Arms" and "Yes I Want You" also made the pop charts, and he had a minor hit with "City Lights" in 1959, just before his popularity began to decline. Hunter came back as a country singer in the late 1960s, making regular Grand Ole Opry appearances and recording an album titled I've Always Been Country.

The country singer Sonny James issued a version of "Since I Met You Baby", which topped the country charts in 1969, paving the way for Hunter's album The Return of Ivory Joe Hunter and his appearance at the Monterey Jazz Festival. The album was recorded in Memphis with a band that included Isaac Hayes, Gene "Bowlegs" Miller and Charles Chalmers. Jerry Lee Lewis recorded a cover version of the song in 1969.

Death
Hunter died of complications due to lung cancer in 1974, at the age of 60, in Memphis, Tennessee. His remains were buried in Spring Hill Community Cemetery.

Singles

Albums
 Ivory Joe Hunter, Atlantic (1957)
 Mean Woman Blues, Pickwick (Grand Prix Series)

References

Notes
 J.C. Marion. JammUpp 23: "Let Me Dream: Ivory Joe Hunter"
 Tom Simon. "Ivory Joe Hunter"

External links 
 TV debut of Ivory Joe Hunter on You Asked For It
 Ivory Joe performing "S.P. Blues"  with brief Nina Simone leading fragment
  Ivory Joe Hunter at Shades Of Blue
 Ivory Joe Hunter, Mean Woman Blues album info
 
 

1914 births
1974 deaths
African-American pianists
American blues singers
American country singer-songwriters
American rhythm and blues singers
American blues pianists
American male pianists
Boogie-woogie pianists
Atlantic Records artists
MGM Records artists
Monument Records artists
Deaths from lung cancer in Tennessee
Four Star Records artists
King Records artists
Singer-songwriters from Texas
People from Jasper County, Texas
Smash Records artists
Tear Drop Records artists
Vee-Jay Records artists
West Coast blues musicians
African-American country musicians
20th-century American pianists
Country musicians from Texas
African-American male singer-songwriters
20th-century African-American male singers